Avianca Perú S.A. (formerly TACA Perú) was an airline based in Lima, Peru. It operated domestic services and international services. Its main base was Jorge Chávez International Airport, Lima. The airline operated out of 18 airports. It was part of the Synergy Group and operated its flights with TACA Airlines' codes.  Through Synergy Group, it was one of the seven nationally branded airlines (Avianca Ecuador, Avianca Costa Rica, etc.) in the Avianca Holdings group of Latin American airlines. The airline ceased all operations on May 10, 2020.

History

The airline was established in 1999 as TransAm and started operations in July 1999. It was founded by Daniel Ratti and Ernesto Mahle. It was rebranded into TACA Perú when Grupo TACA established a holding in the airline.

During 2004, a crisis arose in the aviation industry in Peru, caused by the cessation of operations of Aero Continente, the main operator of internal flights. During this period, TACA Perú made some flights to the city of Rodríguez Ballón International Airport.

In 2007, TACA Perú began a period of expansion and relaunch, increasing the frequencies of its flights to the main cities of Central and South America, offering a wide range of connecting flights from Lima to North America in the mornings and evenings.

In 2012, new national destinations were included, and acquired its first and only Airbus A330-200 for medium-range international flights and its consideration was announced within the change of commercial brand, within the AviancaTaca Holding group, towards the Avianca brand.

On May 28, 2013, the airline was renamed to Avianca Perú after the AviancaTaca merger. It was owned by Daniel Ratti (51%) and the Synergy Group (49%).

In 2015, the offer to São Paulo and San Salvador was expanded, they were operated with its Airbus A330-200. Regarding domestic flights, Chiclayo and Tarapoto were suspended indefinitely, allocating the planes used to an increase in frequencies to Cusco.

On May 10, 2020, Avianca Holdings announced the cancellation of operations in Peru following its filing for bankruptcy protection, starting a process of liquidation and closure of Avianca Perú, which ended the airline after 21 years of operation.

Destinations

Fleet

The Avianca Perú fleet consisted of the following aircraft (as of March 2020):

Retired fleet
Avianca Perú previously operated the following aircraft:

See also
List of defunct airlines of Peru

References

External links
Official website

Defunct airlines of Peru
Airlines established in 1999
Airlines disestablished in 2020
1999 establishments in Peru
2020 disestablishments in South America
Avianca
Latin American and Caribbean Air Transport Association
Grupo TACA